Tevaughn is a given name. Notable people with the name include:

Tevaughn Campbell (born 1993), Canadian professional football player
Tevaughn Harriette (born 1995), Antigua and Barbudan footballer